Rhipsalis crispata is a species of terrestrial plant in the family Cactaceae.

It is endemic to Brazil.  Its natural habitats are subtropical or tropical dry forest and subtropical or tropical moist lowland forest.

Conservation
Rhipsalis crispata, while being widely distributed (an area of less than 2000 km2), is rarely observed. Due to widespread destruction of the habitat it occupies, it has become vulnerable on The IUCN Red List, and its population continues to decrease.

References

crispata
Endemic flora of Brazil
Vulnerable plants
Taxonomy articles created by Polbot